Kazanskaya is a stanitsa in Kavkazsky District of Krasnodar Krai, Russia. It is located on the Kuban River. Population:

References

Rural localities in Krasnodar Krai